North Ayrshire and Arran is a constituency of the British House of Commons, located in the south-west of Scotland within the North Ayrshire council area. It elects one Member of Parliament (MP) at least once every five years using the first-past-the-post voting system of voting.

Once a longtime Conservative seat, the area had been represented by Labour MPs from 1987 until 2015. Patricia Gibson, has held the seat as an SNP member since 2015.

It contains the towns of Largs, Fairlie and West Kilbride to the north, as well as the towns of Ardrossan, Kilbirnie, the Garnock Valley, Kilwinning, Saltcoats and Stevenston to the south. The Isle of Arran and Great Cumbrae are also within the constituency.

Boundaries

The constituency is entirely within the North Ayrshire council area. Part of the same council area is covered by the Central Ayrshire constituency.

The boundaries of North Ayrshire and Arran extend to, and include, Skelmorlie in the north of the council area, Irvine in the south, Beith in the east, and the islands of Arran and Cumbrae in the west.

Constituency profile

The towns of Skelmorlie, Largs, Fairlie and West Kilbride in the north are affluent commuter towns, while Ardrossan, Saltcoats, Irvine, and Stevenston in the south are rather more industrial,  However, regeneration is taking place at Ardrossan Harbour and there has been a rapid increase in new build housing in recent years. Inland, the seat takes in the Garnock valley towns of Dalry, Beith and Kilbirnie, once a centre of steel and textile production long since gone. Tourism is the main industry on Arran and Cumbrae, however the number of holiday homes on the latter has begun to squeeze locals out of the housing market. The seat has two nuclear power stations, Hunterston A nuclear power station (currently being decommissioned) and Hunterston B nuclear power station, as well as a windfarm at Ardrossan.

History
The constituency of North Ayrshire was created in 1868 and was much larger than the present constituency, as it also included the towns of Irvine and Kilmarnock. It returned various Liberal, Liberal Unionist and Conservative MP's, the most well known of whom being Sir Aylmer Hunter-Weston, a general in the First World War who served as MP from 1916 to 1935 first for North Ayrshire and then for Bute and Northern Ayrshire which was created in 1918. Another well-known MP was Sir Fitzroy Maclean, a major-general in the Second World War who was rumoured to be one of Ian Fleming's inspirations for James Bond.

In 1983, the Cunninghame North constituency was created. From 1911 to 1987, the constituencies containing North Ayrshire returned either Conservative Party or Unionist Party MP's until the 1987 general election when the constituency was lost to the Labour Party. In 2015, the seat was won by the SNP. In the 2017 general election the SNP held the seat with a much reduced majority, with the Conservatives more than doubling their vote share.

Members of Parliament

Election results

Elections in the 2010s

2010 general election Campaign

The Conservative Party candidate Philip Lardner was dropped as their official candidate and suspended from his job (but later reinstated) as a Primary School teacher following comments he had made, in which (as a Christian) he described homosexuality as "not normal behaviour". As nominations for candidates had closed, however, the Conservatives were unable to replace him. In 2008 he had previously been suspended as a candidate for the same seat by the Conservatives over claims he made racist remarks, but was later reinstated as the candidate for this seat and exonerated by the Party. Lardner is recorded by the BBC as an "Independent", due to him being "disowned" by the Conservative Party prior to polling day, however, on the actual ballot paper he was still described as a "Scottish Conservatives & Unionist".

The Labour Party chose Katy Clark, the incumbent MP and former trade union official to re-contest the seat. Clark is considered to be quite a left-wing Labour MP as she voted against replacing Trident and is a member of the Scottish Campaign for Socialism.

The Scottish National Party narrowly won the seat of Cunninghame North during the 2007 Scottish parliamentary election and wished to capitalise on this success during the general election. They chose 41-year-old retired English teacher Cllr Patricia Gibson to contest the seat.

The Liberal Democrats chose primary teacher Gillian Cole-Hamilton and Louise McDaid of the Socialist Labour Party also contested the seat as she has done for several elections.

Percentage vote change and percentage swing for the 2005 results are based on notional results on how this constituency would have performed in the 2001 UK General Election.

Elections in the 2000s

References 

Politics of North Ayrshire
Westminster Parliamentary constituencies in Scotland
Constituencies of the Parliament of the United Kingdom established in 2005
Ardrossan−Saltcoats−Stevenston
Garnock Valley
Isle of Arran
Kilwinning
Largs